"One Call Away" is a song by American rapper Chingy, featuring actor Jason Weaver singing the chorus, credited as J-Weav. It was released as the third and final single off his debut album, Jackpot (2003), on January 12, 2004. It was released through Capitol Records and Ludacris's Disturbing tha Peace label. The song peaked at number two on the US Billboard Hot 100, became a number-one hit on the Billboard Hot Rap Songs chart for three weeks, and peaked at numbers three and six on the Billboard Hot R&B/Hip-Hop Songs and Mainstream Top 40 charts, respectively. It also reached the top 40 in Australia, Ireland, New Zealand, and the United Kingdom. A video for the single (directed by Erik White) was released that featured actress Keisha Knight-Pulliam and streetball player Philip "Hot Sauce" Champion.

Critical reception
Matt Cibula of PopMatters was positive towards the song, admiring Chingy for taking on a rap ballad saying "It’s kind of adorable that he’s talking to her on the phone about politics and life when he can’t be with her, and his voice gets all softened when he talks about her, and his homeboys call him weak when he gives her a kiss on the cheek, but he doesn’t care, because he knows that she’s always just one call away from him, and vice versa." In retrospect, however, the song has not fared as well; music critic Todd in the Shadows placed "One Call Away" at number 6 on his list of the "Top Ten Worst Hit Songs of 2004", citing the rapper's weak flow and poor lyricism in particular as dragging the song down.

Music video
Directed by Erik White, the video takes place during autumn and follows Chingy going to the DTP Bank in his Cadillac, where he attracts the attention of a bank teller (played by actress Keisha Knight-Pulliam) by giving her his phone number along with the deposited money in a canister tube for her to have. Their relationship starts out slow with her hanging out with his friends in his apartment, she and her friends watching him play streetball to both of them going back to his apartment to get intimate with each other. The video features the chorus of "Chingy Jackpot" at the end. Streetball player Philip "Hot Sauce" Champion appears in the streetball scene in the video.

Track listings

US 12-inch single
 "One Call Away" (edited radio version featuring J-Weav)
 "One Call Away" (album version featuring J-Weav)
 "One Call Away" (instrumental)
 "Bagg Up" (edited version)
 "Bagg Up" (album version)
 "Bagg Up" (instrumental)

UK CD single
 "One Call Away" (featuring J-Weav)
 "Bagg Up"

European CD single
 "One Call Away" (featuring J-Weav) – 4:36
 "Bagg Up" – 3:21
 "Chingy Jackpot" – 4:08

Australian CD single
 "One Call Away" (edited radio version featuring J-Weav) – 4:18
 "Bagg Up" (edited version) – 3:21
 "Right Thurr" (remix featuring Jermaine Dupri and Trina) – 3:43
 "One Call Away" (instrumental) – 4:42

Charts

Weekly charts

Year-end charts

Certifications

Release history

See also
 List of Billboard number-one rap singles of the 2000s

References

2003 songs
2004 singles
Capitol Records singles
Chingy songs
Contemporary R&B ballads
Music videos directed by Erik White
Song recordings produced by the Trak Starz
Songs written by Chingy